Marc D. Draisen (born December 22, 1956, in Boston, Massachusetts) is an American Urban planner and politician who represented the 11th Suffolk district in the Massachusetts House of Representatives from 1991 to 1995. He was a candidate for Lieutenant Governor of Massachusetts in 1994, but lost in the Democratic primary to Bob Massie.

Draisen is currently the executive director of the Metropolitan Area Planning Council. He is also the former chairman of Massachusetts Voters for Clean Elections and the former president and executive director of the Massachusetts Association of Community Development Corporations.
He has one son, Samuel Draisen, and one daughter Katie Draisen.

See also
 1991–1992 Massachusetts legislature
 1993–1994 Massachusetts legislature

References

External links
 

1956 births
Democratic Party members of the Massachusetts House of Representatives
Politicians from Boston
Brandeis University alumni
MIT School of Architecture and Planning alumni
Living people
American urban planners
People from Roslindale